Rabbi David Jaffe is a leading figure in the contemporary renewal of the Musar movement, a Jewish ethical movement. He is the author of Changing the World from the Inside Out: A Jewish Approach to Personal and Social Change, for which he was awarded the Jewish Book Council’s Myra H. Kraft Memorial Award in Contemporary Jewish Life and Practice in 2016. Jaffe is also a political activist who has been noted for his work in encouraging better funding for public schools in Massachusetts.

References

Living people
Musar movement
Year of birth missing (living people)
Place of birth missing (living people)
Nationality missing
Jewish non-fiction writers
Education activists
21st-century American rabbis